Castanopsis endertii is a tree in the family Fagaceae. It is named for the Dutch botanist and plant collector Frederik Endert.

Description
The brownish bark is slightly fissured with ring-like features.

Distribution and habitat
Castanopsis endertii is endemic to Borneo. Its habitat is montane forests up to  altitude.

References

endertii
Endemic flora of Borneo
Trees of Borneo
Plants described in 1968
Flora of the Borneo montane rain forests